Oprichnik (man aside; plural Oprichniki) was the designation given to a member of the Oprichnina, a bodyguard corps
established by Tsar Ivan the Terrible to govern a division of Russia from 1565 to 1572.

Foundation
Some scholars believe that Ivan's second wife, the Circassian Maria Temryukovna, first had the idea of forming the organization. This theory comes from  Heinrich von Staden, a German oprichnik. Maria Temryukovna's brother also became a leading oprichnik.

Oath

Upon acceptance, the new Oprichniki were required to swear an oath of allegiance:
I swear to be true to the Lord, Grand Prince, and his realm, to the young Grand Princes, and to the Grand Princess, and not to maintain silence about any evil that I may know or have heard or may hear which is being contemplated against the Tsar, his realms, the young princes or the Tsaritsa. I swear also not to eat or drink with the zemshchina, and not to have anything in common with them. On this I kiss the cross.

Description
Modern theories suggest that the motivating purpose for the organization and existence of the Oprichniki was to oppress people or groups opposed to the Tsar. Known to ride black horses and led by Ivan himself, the group was known to terrorize civilian populations. Sometimes called the cromeshnina (selected) because they were a hand-picked body, the Oprichniki dressed in black garb, similar to a monastic habit, and carried attached to their saddles a severed dog's head (to sniff out treason and enemies of the Tsar), or an actual wolf's head and a broom (to sweep them away). The wolf's head was also symbolic of the hounds of hell tearing at the heels of the Tsar's enemies. The logistics of acquiring the canine heads was quite gruesome. Due to the lack of taxidermy, the severed and drained heads would only remain frozen for the winter months of the year. To maintain their image, the Oprichnik required a constant supply of fresh heads. Ivan himself carried a fearsome canine head made of iron with jaws that would open and snap shut as his horse galloped.

The Oprichniki were ordered to execute anyone disloyal to Ivan and used various methods of torture to do so, including  quartering, death by boiling, impalement, and roasting victims tied to poles over an open fire.

When Ivan declared himself the "Hand of God", he selected 300 of the Oprichniki to be his personal "brotherhood" and live in his castle at Aleksandrovskaia Sloboda near Vladimir. At 4 a.m., these select Oprichniki attended a sermon given by Ivan, then performed the day's ritual executions. The Oprichniki sought to lead an externally ascetic lifestyle, like the monks they emulated, but it was punctuated by acts of cruelty and debauchery. Ivan sang while his Oprichniki ate, eating only when they had finished. At 9 p.m. he went to bed, listening to stories told by three blind men.

In the Novgorod incident, the Oprichniks killed an estimated 1500 "big people" (nobles), although the actual number of victims is unknown. By 1572, the Oprichnik had become a destabilizing force and were disbanded by Ivan, especially as he blamed them for the lack of response to the Tartar sack of Moscow in 1571. Thereafter it became a capital offense to say or discuss "Oprichnina".

Appearances in modern media
 
The Oprichnik is an opera by Pyotr Ilyich Tchaikovsky, based on the drama The Oprichniks (Опричники) (1842) written by Ivan Lazhechnikov.
 Oprichniki Malyuta Skuratov, Alexei Basmanov and his son Fyodor Basmanov are main characters in Ivan the Terrible, a classic historical epic film (released in two parts in 1944 and 1946) directed by Sergei Eisenstein, .
The song "Dog and Broom" on Arghoslent's Hornets of the Pogrom album focuses specifically on the Oprichniki, and makes reference to their actions during the 1570 Novgorod Massacre.
The Twelve Wallachian mercenaries in the 2009 novel Twelve by Jasper Kent are named after the original Oprichniki, but are not directly connected to them.
Author W. E. B. Griffin's novel Black Ops claims as a plot point that all subsequent Russian secret police agencies such as the SVR are descendants of the Oprichniki.
The novel Day of the Oprichnik by Vladimir Sorokin imagines the return of the Oprichniki in a futuristic-theocratic Russia.
The Oprichniki appear in Tsar, a 2009 Russian drama film directed by Pavel Lungin.
Oprichniks appear as one of the unique cavalry units of the Russian civilization in Age of Empires III, adept at eliminating villagers and destroying town structures
Latter-day Oprichniki appear in Eric Flint's 1636: The Kremlin Games.
The Oprichniki appear to back up Ivan the Terrible in Deadliest Warrior, against Hernán Cortés and his Conquistadors
The Oprichniki appear as antagonists in the Anastasia chapter of the mobile game Fate/Grand Order.
The Oprichniki in The Grishaverse book series - and recent Netflix adaptation, Shadow and Bone - by Leigh Bardugo are based on, and named after the original Oprichniki, and make up the personal guard of the series' main antagonist, The Darkling.

References

1560s in Russia
Secret police
Extrajudicial killings
1570s in Russia